Chapman Township, Nebraska may refer to the following places in Nebraska:

 Chapman Township, Merrick County, Nebraska
 Chapman Township, Saunders County, Nebraska

See also
Chapman Township (disambiguation)

Nebraska township disambiguation pages